The Theban Tomb TT53 is located in Sheikh Abd el-Qurna. It forms part of the Theban Necropolis, situated on the west bank of the Nile opposite Luxor. The tomb is the burial place of the ancient Egyptian official Amenemhet, who was an administrator in the Amun Temple during the reign of Thutmose III.

See also
 List of Theban tombs

References

Buildings and structures completed in the 13th century BC
Theban tombs